The Family Law Reform Act 1969 is an Act of Parliament amending various aspects of Family Law in English Law. The Act is in four parts.

PART I – Reduction of Age of Majority and Related Provisions

Part I deals with the reduction of the Age of Majority in England and Wales from 21 to 18. Provides provision for the Parliament of Northern Ireland to enact similar legislation

PART II – Property Rights of Illegitimate Children

Part II has mostly been repealed by subsequent legislation

S19. Policies of assurance and property in industrial and provident societies, provides rights to illegitimate children under the Married Women's Property Act 1882 and the Married Women's Policies of Assurance (Scotland) Act 1880

PART III –  Provisions for user of Blood Tests in Determining Paternity

PArt III provides the Courts with the power to compel the taking of blood tests to determine paternity of a child.

PART IV – Miscellaneous and General

Part IV Allows for the rebuttal of legal presumptions of legitimacy or illegitimacy with evidence of probability that a person is legitimate or illegitimate

References

1969 in England
United Kingdom Acts of Parliament 1969
Acts of the Parliament of the United Kingdom concerning England and Wales
Law reform in the United Kingdom
Majority (law)
Children's rights legislation
Juvenile law
Youth rights in the United Kingdom